A bell is a percussion instrument, usually cup-shaped.

Bell may also refer to:

Sound and music

 Bell (wind instrument), a part of a wind instrument
 Bell cymbal, a type of cymbal, tending to be thick and uniformly so, and small
 Bell effect, a musical technique
 Cymbal bell, the most central part of a cymbal

Signals
 Bell, a signal from an engine order telegraph, a communications device used on a ship or submarine
 Alarm bell, used to alert people of a fire or burglary detected or, as part of a traditional alarm clock, to awaken or remind
 Church bell, indicating when to go to church
 Doorbell, a signaling device to alert residents to visitors
 Division bell, used in a parliament to call members to a vote
 Last call bell, a signal that a bar is closing soon
 School bell, a signal used for transitions during a school day
 Ship's bell, a signal for marking time on a ship

People
 Bell (surname), a list of people with the surname Bell
 Alexander Graham Bell (1847–1922), Scottish-Canadian-American inventor, teacher, engineer, and scientist, son of Alexander Melville Bell
 John Stewart Bell or J. S. Bell (1928–1990), Northern Irish physicist and the originator of Bell's theorem in quantum physics
 bell hooks, pen name of Gloria Jean Watkins (1952–2021), American author, academic, and activist

Places

Africa
 Bell, Eastern Cape, a South African town
 Port Bell, Lake Victoria, Uganda

Australia 
 Bell, New South Wales
 Bell, Queensland

Canada
 Bell Island (Newfoundland and Labrador), Newfoundland and Labrador
 Bell Peninsula, Nunavut
 Bell River (Quebec), a tributary of Matagami Lake, then Nottaway River flowing in Abitibi-Témiscamingue and in Nord-du-Québec, in Quebec, in Canada

Europe
 Bell, Mayen-Koblenz, Germany, a municipality
 Bell, Rhein-Hunsrück, Germany, a municipality
 Bell End, UK

United States
 Bell, California
 Bell, Florida
 Bell, Illinois
 Bell, Oklahoma
 Bell, Wisconsin
 Bell Canyon, California
 Bell City, Missouri
 Bell County, Kentucky
 Bell County, Texas
 Bell Township, Pennsylvania (disambiguation)

Other places
 Bell (crater), a crater on the Moon
 Bell Creek (disambiguation)

Art, entertainment, and media
 Bell (fictional currency), in the game Animal Crossing
 Bell Fibe TV, an IP-based television service offered in Ontario and Quebec

Buildings
 Bell (St. Paul's Churchyard), a historical bookseller in London
 Bell Centre, a stadium in Montreal, Quebec, Canada
 Bell Laboratories Building, an historic building in Manhattan, New York
 Bell Lightbox, a skyscraper in Toronto, Ontario, Canada
 Bell Sensplex, a four-pad ice facility in the city of Ottawa, Ontario, Canada
 Bell Sports Complex, a sports facility in Brossard, Quebec, Canada
 Campus Bell, headquarters of Bell Canada, on Nuns' Island in Montreal, Canada

Businesses

Public houses
 Bell Inn, Enfield, London, England
 The Bell, City of London, England
 The Bell Inn, Aldworth, Berkshire, England
 The Bell Inn, Long Hanborough, Oxfordshire, England
 The Bell Inn, Nottingham, England

Telecommunications
 Alcatel-Lucent Shanghai Bell
 Bell Atlantic, the name of the Bell Operating Company serving the mid-Atlantic US, merged in 2000 with GTE to form Verizon
 BCE Inc., formerly Bell Canada Enterprises, a telecommunications holding company in Canada
 Bell Aliant, a telecommunications subsidiary of Bell Canada
 Bell Canada, a telecommunications subsidiary of BCE Inc.
 Bell Internet, an internet service provider and subsidiary of Bell Canada 
 Bell Media, a media subsidiary of BCE Inc.
 Bell MTS, a telecommunications subsidiary of Bell Canada
 Bell Mobility, a wireless network subsidiary of Bell Canada
 Bell Satellite TV, a satellite television service and subsidiary of Bell Canada
 Bell Communications Research, Inc., a research & development organization, originally a joint subsidiary of the Regional Bell Operating Companies, since renamed to Telcordia Technologies, Inc. and now a subsidiary of Ericsson
 Bell Labs, a research & development organization founded by AT&T, now owned by Nokia
 Bell System, the organization that provided telephone service in the United States until 1984
 Bell Telephone Company, founded in 1877 by the family of Alexander Graham Bell
 Illinois Bell, the name of the Bell Operating Company serving Illinois
 Indiana Bell, the Bell Operating Company serving Indiana
 Michigan Bell, the subsidiary of AT&T serving the state of Michigan
 Mountain Bell, the name of the Bell Operating Company serving the US Rocky Mountain region
 Nevada Bell, the Bell System's telephone provider in Nevada
 New Jersey Bell, (1904–1983)
 Northwestern Bell, the name of the Bell Operating Company serving the North Central and Northwestern US
 Ohio Bell, the Bell Operating Company serving most of Ohio
 Pacific Bell, the name of the Bell System's telephone operations in California
 Regional Bell Operating Company, any of the phone companies spun off from AT&T in 1984
 South Central Bell, the name of the Bell Operating Company serving the South-Central US
 Southern Bell, the name of the Bell Operating Company serving the Southeastern US
 Southwestern Bell, the name of the Bell Operating Company serving Kansas, Missouri, Oklahoma, and Texas
 Wisconsin Bell, (1984–1999)

Other business
 Bell Aircraft, an aircraft manufacturer of the United States
 Bell Helicopter, an American rotorcraft manufacturer
 Bell ID, a software company based in The Netherlands
 Bell Records, a record label
 Bell Sports Inc., a helmet manufacturer
 Bell's Brewery, based in Michigan

Mathematics, science and technology
 Bell, the body of a jellyfish
 Bell character, in computing, a device control code
 Bell number, in mathematics
 Bell polynomials, in mathematics
 Bell state, in quantum information science
 Diving bell, a cable-suspended underwater airtight chamber

Transportation

Rail
 Bell (METRORail station), Houston, Texas, United States
 Bell railway station, Melbourne, Australia
 Bell railway station, New South Wales, Australia

Sea
 SS Empire Bell, a Swedish collier (bulk cargo ship) launched in 1930
 USS Bell, either of two U.S. Navy ships

Other forms of transportation
 Bell (cyclecar), a British three-wheeled cyclecar made in 1920 by W.G. Bell of Rochester, Kent
 Bell tailslide, an aerobatic maneuver

Other uses
 Bell (typeface), a typeface designed in 1788 by Richard Austin
 Bell Challenge, a WTA Tour Tier III tennis tournament held in Quebec
 Bell High School (disambiguation)
 Bell House (disambiguation)
 Bell Lake (disambiguation)
 Bell pepper

See also
 Bel (disambiguation)
 Bell, Book & Candle (disambiguation)
 Belle (disambiguation)
 Bells (disambiguation)
 The Bell (disambiguation)
 The Bells (disambiguation)
 Justice Bell (disambiguation)
 Glockenspiel (disambiguation)